Nedbank Cup is a South African club football (soccer) tournament. The knockout tournament, based on the English FA Cup format, carries a 'David versus Goliath' theme. The competition was sponsored by ABSA until 2007, after which Nedbank took over sponsorship.

Format
The 16 Premier Soccer League clubs, 8 National First Division teams, as well as 8 teams from the amateur ranks compete for the prize money of R6 million. The winner also qualifies for the CAF Confederation Cup.

The teams are not seeded at any stage, and the first 16 sides drawn out of the hat receive a home-ground advantage. There are no longer any replays in the tournament, and any games which end in a draw after 90 minutes are subject to 30 minutes extra time followed by penalties if necessary.

Teams
The 32 teams competing in the Nedbank Cup competition are: (listed according to the league that they are playing in).

Premier Soccer League

 Ajax Cape Town
 AmaZulu
 Bay United
 Bidvest Wits
 Bloemfontein Celtic
 Free State Stars
 Golden Arrows
 Kaizer Chiefs
 Mamelodi Sundowns
 Maritzburg United
 Moroka Swallows
 Orlando Pirates
 Platinum Stars
 Santos
 Supersport United
 Thanda Royal Zulu

National First Division

 Carara Kicks
 Black Leopards
 Ikapa Sporting
 Durban Stars
 Mpumalanga Black Aces
 Winners Park
 Nathi Lions
 Pretoria University

Vodacom League

 Blackburn Rovers
 Thistle Groove
 Maluti FET College
 Newcastle Sicillians
 Peace Lovers
 Real Madrid
 Milano United
 Garankuwa United

Results

Preliminary round

The preliminary round saw the National First Division sides play each other is a knockout round to decide who will compete in the 2009 Nedbank Cup. All the game were played on 16 December 2008 and the winners of each game went into the draw to determine the fixtures for the first round.

Bracket

First round (round of 32)

Teams Qualified for Second round

 Black Leopards (NFD)
 Pretoria University (NFD)
 Mamelodi Sundowns (PSL)
 Ikapa Sporting (NFD)
 Ajax Cape Town (PSL)
 Platinum Stars (PSL)
 Orlando Pirates (PSL)
 Bloemfontein Celtic (PSL)
 Winners Park (NFD)
 Kaizer Chiefs (PSL)
 Maritzburg United (PSL)
 Bay United (PSL)
 Nathi Lions (NFD)
 Santos (PSL)
 Moroka Swallows (PSL)
 Peace Lovers (Vodacom League)

Second round (round of 16)
Orlando Pirates have been handed a tricky tie in the Last 16 of the Nedbank Cup, but Kaizer Chiefs will back their chances against First Division side AmaTuks.

Bucs will travel to Bloemfontein to face PSL strugglers Bloemfontein Celtic, who will be counting on their incredible home support to see them past the high-flying Soweto side.

Chiefs have been paired with Pretoria University, while Mamelodi Sundowns face a tough task against Miguel Gamondi's Platinum Stars.

Peace Lovers, the last remaining Vodacom League side in the draw, have been rewarded for their win against Real Madrid with a home tie against Moroka Swallows.

The continued unavailability of venues due to preparations for the 2009 Fifa Confederations and 2010 World Cup is giving several clubs a king size headache just hours after the Nedbank Cup Last 16 draw.

Teams Qualified for Quarter-finals

 Maritzburg United (PSL)
 Winners Park (NFD)
 Black Leopards (NFD)
 Bloemfontein Celtic (PSL)
 Pretoria University (NFD)
 Ajax Cape Town (PSL)
 Platinum Stars (PSL)
 Moroka Swallows (PSL)

Quarter-finals

Only the strongest have survived to reach the Nedbank Cup quarterfinals draw held in Johannesburg on the morning of 23 March 2009.

The draw was without the big three teams.

Defending champions Mamelodi Sundowns were knocked out by a gallant Platinum Stars on Sunday afternoon 22 March 2009.

Sundowns' exit was not the only shock of the tournament, as Kaizer Chiefs lost to First Division team Pretoria University and Pirates also lost to Bloemfontein Celtic.

Teams Qualified for Semi-finals

 Ajax Cape Town (PSL)
 Pretoria University (NFD)
 Black Leopards (NFD)
 Moroka Swallows (PSL)

Semi-finals

On Tuesday 14 April 2009 the first Division giant killers Pretoria University drew their third successive Premier Soccer League side in the form of Ajax Cape Town  when the draw for the semifinal of the country's biggest knockout competition was made.

In the other semifinal another First Division giant killer, Black Leopards, will play Moroka Swallows.

 Late goals from Igor Alves and Thulani Ngcepe were enough to see Moroka Swallows defeat Black Leopards 2–1 at the Peter Mokaba Stadium on Saturday evening and book their place in the Nedbank Cup final.
 First division side Pretoria University beat Ajax Cape Town 2–1 after extra time in the semifinal of the Nedbank Cup. All the goals in this entertaining clash were scored in extra time. Tukkies will now face Moroka Swallows in the Nedbank Cup final on 23 May. The cup tie was played at Johannesburg's BidVest Wits Stadium on Sunday afternoon.

Finals

Top Goal scorers

Notes and references

External links
Nedbank Cup Official Website
Nedbank Official Website
Premier Soccer League
South African Football Association
Confederation of African Football

2009 domestic association football cups
2008–09 in South African soccer
2009